Pinanthode is a panchayat town in Kanniyakumari district in the Indian state of Tamil Nadu, near the Thirparappu waterfalls.

Cities and towns in Kanyakumari district